The End are comic books published by Marvel Comics, which take place outside of normal continuity, which feature possible final endings for Marvel characters. The outcomes vary from grim to optimistic.

Titles
 Fantastic Four: The End (six-issue limited series)
 Hulk: The End (one-shot)
 Iron Man: The End (one-shot)
 Marvel: The End (six-issue limited series)
 Spider-Girl: The End! (one-shot)
 The Punisher: The End (one-shot)
 Wolverine: The End (six-issue limited series)
 X-Men: The End (a trilogy of six-issue limited series)
 Captain America: The End (one-shot) 
 Captain Marvel: The End (one-shot) 
 Deadpool: The End (one-shot) 
 Doctor Strange: The End (one-shot) 
 Miles Morales: The End (one-shot) 
 Venom: The End (one-shot)

Collected editions

References

 
Marvel Comics lines